Theepetti Ganesan (October 16, 1990 – March 22, 2021), also known by his birth name Karthik, was an Indian actor. He was known for playing prominent supporting roles in Seenu Ramasamy's directorial films. His breakthrough performance came in the film Renigunta (2009).

Life 
In April 2020, in an interview he revealed that he faced severe financial tussles due to lack of film opportunities in last few years and revealed that his film career was hit hard during the COVID-19 pandemic. He also engaged in small scale businesses during the COVID-19 pandemic time in order to run his family. He also urged financial assistance to his family and it was revealed that fellow actor Snehan had offered him financial assistance.

Filmography

Films

Death 
He died on 22 March 2021 in Madurai due to illness. Prior to his death, he underwent treatment at Madurai Rajaji Hospital.

References

External links 

 
 

1990 births
2021 deaths
21st-century Tamil male actors
Indian male comedians
Indian male film actors
Male actors in Tamil cinema
People from Madurai
Tamil comedians
Tamil male actors